George Stuart (born 1929) is an American sculptor, raconteur and historian.  He has traveled the United States presenting historical monologues about the last four centuries in the Americas, Europe, Russia and China. To help audiences visualize the personalities in his monologues, Stuart created over 400 historically accurate, quarter life-size sculptures of personages with political influence from the 16th to the 19th century. His works have been exhibited in The Smithsonian and Clinton Presidential Library as well as at other museums and libraries throughout the United States.

Early career 
As a young boy, Stuart traveled to Europe and became increasingly interested in historical architecture.  In his teens, he constructed a scale model of the French Palace of Versailles and began to experiment with the human form after receiving an articulated marionette as a gift. Illness deterred him for a time, but he persisted and enrolled in first Georgetown University then the American University in Washington, D.C. where he studied history, economics, languages and international law to prepare to become a Foreign Service Officer. But his academic career was frustrated by dyslexia, a condition not recognized in those days.

Then, in the early 1950s, he was offered a position at the Smithsonian Institution, where he sculpted figures of inventors to accompany patent models exhibited there.  As a member of the Smithsonian staff, he also participated in the development of the Presidents' Wives exhibit.

After Stuart completed a degree in Fine Arts at the University of California in Santa Barbara, where he found himself drawn to theater arts, he began touring the country performing historical monologues accompanied by eight to twelve of his figures. He was represented by the Samuel Horton Brown Agency in Beverly Hills, joining the firm's other clients including Margaret Meade. Focusing on power and political intrigue, Stuart developed over 20 programs using his historical figures as visual aids.

When Stuart moved to Ojai, California in 1959, he opened The Gallery of Historical Figures and began teaching workshops on figural construction, costuming and sculpting faces. In 1991, the city of Ojai presented Stuart with its Lifetime Achievement in the Arts award. He also has been recognized by the United States Congress.

"Historical Figures"
Each historical figure begins with a jointed iron wire skeleton in quarter scale that is designed to move like the treasured marionette from Stuart's childhood. The head is modeled separately, beginning with a skull structure built up with clay then molded in plastic. The facial features are defined using a jeweler's loup and fine instruments. Blown glass eyes are then inserted from the inside.  The body is then built up with papier maché, cotton fiber, and styrofoam enclosed with wool felt skin. After he chooses an appropriate pose, the figure is then finished with a custom plastique that Stuart developed himself after years of experimentation to achieve the look of life-like skin.

He has created more than 400 "Historical Figures" in groups to complement his performances. The groups include, American Revolutionary and Civil Wars (Samuel Adams to Abraham Lincoln), English Monarchies (Henry VII to Edward VII), Bourbon Dynasty (Henry IV to Charles X), Czarist Russia (Ivan IV to Joseph Stalin) Manchu Dynasty (Nurhaci to Mao Tse-tung, Renaissance & Reformation (various rulers and clergy), Conquest of the Americas (Columbus to John Fremont), Really Awful People (including Hitler, Stalin, Mao, Attila the Hun, Vlad the Impaler, Nero, Ivan the Terrible, and the Borgias), Warriors of the Ages, Germanic Myth & Legend (northern pantheon) and his earliest works. 

One of his most popular presentations focused on history's "Really Awful People" group. 

"The story begins with a massacre and ends with a slaughter," Stuart observed. "In between we have murder, rape, sex violence, intrigue and political chicanery." 

Stuart reported his most popular figurines are those of Lincoln. He produced five different versions of Lincoln from his early years to his appearance at the time of the 16th president's assassination. His figures from the American Revolutionary and Civil War periods were featured in the exhibit "Revolution and Rebellion: Wars, Words and Figures." at the William J. Clinton Presidential Library in September, 2011.  

Stuart's quest for historical accuracy led him to import specially-scaled chain mail, embroidered silks, and Icelandic sheepskin for life-like hair. Stuart fabricated historically accurate metal helmets, armor, weapons, crowns, and accessories.

More than 200 of Stuart's Historical Figures now reside in the permanent collections of the Museum of Ventura County where a special gallery was constructed for their display. Other figures are in the collections of the Naples Museum of Art in Naples, Florida. Temporary exhibits have been held at the Pasadena Museum of History, the Ojai Valley Museum of History and Art, the Oxnard Library, California State University, and the  William J. Clinton Presidential Library and Museum.

Gallery

References

Related publications

External links 
 Historical Figures of George Stuart (official website).
 Introducing George Stuart and his Historical Figures (video).

Monolog videos

English History

Prince Albert
Prince Albert Victor
Alexandra Princess of Wales 1
Alexandra Princess of Wales 2
Queen Anne
Beau Brummel
Anne Boleyn
Bonnie Prince Charlie
Benjamin Disraeli
Cardinal Woolsey
Caroline von Anspach
Caroline Von Brunswick
Catherine of Aragon
King Charles I
King Charles II
Queen Charlotte Sophia
Countess of Darlington
King Edward VI
Edward Prince of Wales
Queen Elizabeth I
Earl of Essex
Florence Nightingale
King George I
King George II
King George III in robes of state
King George III circa 1780
King George III circa 1818
King George IV
George Villiers Duke of Buckingham
Queen Henrietta Maria
King Henry VII
King Henry VIII
Sir Henry Clinton
Jack the Ripper
King James I
King James II
John Brown
Sir John Burgoyne
John Churchill Duke of Marlborough
John Knox
Duchess of Kendal
Maria Fitzherbert
Mary Stuart
Mary Tudor
Nell Gwynne
Oliver Cromwell
Oscar Wilde
Sarah Churchill Duchess of Marlborough
Queen Victoria circa 1837
Queen Victoria circa 1860
Queen Victoria circa 1900
King William III
William Gladstone
Sir William Cecil-Burleigh

Russian History

Tsar Alexander I
Tsar Alexander II
Tsar Alexander III
Empress Alexandra Fedorovna
Tsarevich Alexei Nikolaevich
Tsar Alexis Mikhailovich
Tsarevich Alexis Petrovich
Anastasia Romanova
Empress Anna Ivanova
Boris Godunov
Empress Catherine I
Empress Catherine II
Empress Catherine II in robes of state
Empress Elizabeth I
Eudoxia Lopukhina
Gregory Rasputin
Prince Grigory Potemkin
Tsar Ivan IV The Terrible
Tsar Ivan V
Joseph Stalin
Baroness Krudener
Empress Marie Feodorovna
Tsar Michael Romanov
[*Baroness Krudener Natalia Narishkina]
Tsar Nicholas I
Tsar Nicholas II
Patriarch Nikon
Paul I
Tsar Peter The Great
Tsar Peter III
Patriarch Philaret
Tsarevna Sophia Alekseyevna
Russian Serfs Liberation
Stenka Razin
Vladimir Lenin
Yemelyan Pugachev

Others

The Despicable Borgias
Diamonds are Forever Pt 1
Diamonds are Forever Pt 2
The Nordic Gods Pt 1 The Sagas
The Nordic Gods Pt 2 Thor and Freya
The Nordic Gods Pt 3 The Saga of Siegfried
The Nordic Gods Pt 4 Ragnarok
Zulu Warrior

1929 births
Living people
20th-century American sculptors
Georgetown University alumni
American University alumni
University of California, Santa Barbara alumni
21st-century American sculptors